Kim Yeong-nam (born 29 January 1996) is a South Korean diver. In 2021, he represented South Korea at the 2020 Summer Olympics in Tokyo, Japan.

References

External links
 

Living people
1996 births
South Korean male divers
Competitors at the 2015 Summer Universiade
Competitors at the 2017 Summer Universiade
Medalists at the 2015 Summer Universiade
Medalists at the 2017 Summer Universiade
Universiade medalists in diving
Universiade gold medalists for South Korea
Universiade silver medalists for South Korea
Universiade bronze medalists for South Korea
Asian Games medalists in diving
Asian Games silver medalists for South Korea
Asian Games bronze medalists for South Korea
Divers at the 2014 Asian Games
Divers at the 2018 Asian Games
Medalists at the 2014 Asian Games
Medalists at the 2018 Asian Games
Divers at the 2020 Summer Olympics
Olympic divers of South Korea
Sportspeople from Seoul
21st-century South Korean people